Madžari is a neighbourhood in the City of Skopje, North Macedonia, administered by the Gazi Baba Municipality.

Demographics
According to the 2002 census, the town had a total of 12874 inhabitants. Ethnic groups in the town include:

Sports
The local football club FK Madžari Solidarnost has played in the Macedonian First Football League.

References

External links

Gazi Baba Municipality
Neighbourhoods in Gazi Baba Municipality
Neighbourhoods of Skopje